The Becker–Rosenthal trial was a 1912 trial in New York City for the murder of Herman Rosenthal, a bookmaker, by NYPD Lieutenant Charles Becker and members of the Lenox Avenue Gang. The trial ran from October 7 to October 30, 1912, and restarted on May 2 to May 22, 1914. Other procedural events took place in 1915. 

Five men, including former Lieutenant Becker, were convicted on murder charges and sentenced to death. Each was executed by the state at Sing Sing prison.

History
In July 1912, Lieutenant Charles Becker was named in the New York World as one of three senior police officials involved in the case of Herman Rosenthal, a small-time bookmaker and gambler who had complained to the press that his illegal casinos had been affected by the greed of Becker and his associates. Rosenthal accused the police of demanding a large percentage of his illegal profits as protection in exchange for allowing him to continue to operate. 

At 2 a.m. on July 16, two days after the New York World article was published, Rosenthal was murdered on the street after leaving the Hotel Metropole at 147 West 43rd Street, just off Times Square. He was gunned down by men found to be a crew of Jewish gangsters from the Lower East Side. In the aftermath, Manhattan District Attorney Charles S. Whitman, who had made an appointment with Rosenthal before his death, said that he believed the gangsters had committed the murder at Becker's behest.

John J. Reisler, also known as "John the Barber", told the police that he had seen "Bridgey" Webber running away from the crime scene directly after the killing. After he recanted the next week, likely after being threatened by gangsters, he was charged with perjury.

The New York Times and other major newspapers covered the murder investigation for months, with the Times featuring it on the front page, as it led into complex criminal activities. The events were so complex that the New York Police Department recalled 30 detectives from retirement to help investigate and were said "to know most of the gangsters." One of the recalled detectives, Detective Frank Upton, formerly of the "Italian Squad," was instrumental in the July 25, 1912, arrest of "Dago" Frank Cirofici, one of the suspected killers. He and his companion, Regina Gorden (formerly known as "Rose Harris"), were "so stupefied by opium that they offered no objection to their arrests," according to The New York Times. The department then had one of its policewomen, Mary A. Sullivan, go undercover to gain the trust of Gorden. She befriended the woman as well as other girlfriends and wives of the suspects, which helped to break the case.

Defendants

Convicted and sentenced to death
Charles Becker (1870–1915), NYPD lieutenant charged with ordering the murder and having protected and extorted from illegal gamblers, executed
Francisco Cirofici (1887–1914), aka Dago Frank, gunman, executed
Harry Horowitz (1889–1914), aka Gyp the Blood, gunman, executed
Louis Rosenberg (1891–1914), aka Lefty Louie and Louis Marks, gunman, executed
Jacob Seidenshner (1888–1914), aka Frank Muller and Whitey Lewis, gunman, executed

Other participants in the case
William Bourke Cockran (1854–1923), one of Becker's defense lawyers
Martin Thomas Manton (1880–1946), one of Becker's defense lawyers at the trial.
John B. Johnston (1882–1960), one of Becker's defense lawyers
Sam Paul (1874–1927), gambler and owner of the club at which police first thought that the murder was planned.
Jacob A. Rich (1877–1938), also known as Jack Sullivan and Jacob A. Reich, testified for Becker's defense.
Jack Rose (1875–1947), aka Baldy Rose, gambler and informant who testified against Becker at the trial
Herman Rosenthal, murdered bookmaker and gambler.
Sam Schepps (?–1936), also known as Schapps, mob informant who testified against defendants at the trial
 Frank Upton, Detective, father of Frances Upton, actress
Harry Vallon, mob informant who testified against the defendants at the trial
Louis William Webber (1877–1936), aka Bridgey Webber, mob informant who testified against the defendants at the trial
Charles Seymour Whitman (1868–1947), district attorney, elected in 1914 as governor of New York
Jack Zelig (1888–1912), murdered before he could testify for the prosecution.

In popular culture
The British writer P.G. Wodehouse wrote a foreword to his novel Psmith, Journalist (1914) that noted the Rosenthal case by way of showing how common gang murders in New York were at the time. He did not discuss the complicity of the police.

In F. Scott Fitzgerald's novel The Great Gatsby (1925), the fictional gambler Meyer Wolfsheim mentions having been present in the Metropole with Rosenthal moments before the latter was murdered.

The writer, Viña Delmar, wrote about the murder in :

See also
 George Samuel Dougherty

References

External links

 
20th-century American trials
Eastman Gang
1912 in law
1912 in New York City
Murder trials
Murder in New York City
People murdered by Jewish-American organized crime
People murdered by law enforcement officers in the United States
Crimes in New York City
 1912 murders in the United States